JetBrains MPS (Meta Programming System) is a language workbench developed by JetBrains. MPS is a tool to design domain-specific languages (DSL). It uses projectional editing which allows users to overcome the limits of language parsers, and build DSL editors, such as ones with tables and diagrams.
It implements language-oriented programming. MPS is an environment for language definition, a language workbench, and integrated development environment (IDE) for such languages.

Composable languages
Developers from different domains can benefit from domain-specific language extensions in general-purpose programming languages. For example, Java developers working with financial applications might benefit from built-in support of monetary values. Traditional text-based languages are subject to text ambiguity problems which makes such extensions problematic.

MPS supports composable language definitions. This means that languages can be extended, and embedded, and these extensions can be used, and will work, in the same program in MPS. For example, if Java is extended with a better syntax for collections and then again extended with a better syntax for dates, these extensions will work well together.

MPS solves grammar ambiguity issues by working with the abstract syntax tree directly. In order to edit such a tree, a text-like projectional editor is used.

Reusable language infrastructure
MPS provides a reusable language infrastructure which is configured with language definition languages. MPS also provides many IDE services automatically: editor, code completion, find usages, etc.

Existing languages
 Base Language - 99% Java reimplemented with MPS. There are a lot of extensions of this language
 collections language
 dates language
 closures language
 regular expressions language
 Language definition languages - these language are implemented with themselves, i.e. bootstrapped
 structure language
 editor language
 constraints language
 type system language
 generator language

MPS applications

Mbeddr
mbeddr is an embedded development system based on MPS. It has languages tailored to embedded development
and formal methods:
 Core C language
 Components 
 Physical units
 State machines

YouTrack
In October 2009, JetBrains released the YouTrack bug tracking system - the first commercial software product developed with MPS.

Realaxy editor
In April 2010, the Realaxy ActionScript Editor beta was released, the first commercial IDE based on the MPS platform.

PEoPL
PEoPL is a tool for software product line engineering realised in MPS.

GDF (Gamification Design Framework)
GDF is a framework for designing and deploying gameful applications. GDF consists of domain-specific languages allowing for stepwise refinement of application definitions, from higher levels of abstraction towards implementation code to be run on a gamification engine.

According to GDF's case study from Jetbrains, MPS was chosen for three main reasons: the need to provide text-based DSLs, the availability of language extension mechanisms conveying consistency management between abstraction layers, and the provision of generators to automatically derive implementation code.

Licensing
The MPS source code is released under the Apache License.

See also
 Intentional programming
 Xtext

References

External links
 
 MPS blog
 MPS User's Guide

Language workbench